Janet Currie is a Canadian-American economist and the Henry Putnam Professor of Economics and Public Affairs at Princeton University's School of Public and International Affairs, where she is Co-Director of the Center for Health and Wellbeing. She served as the Chair of the Department of Economics at Princeton from 2014–2018. She also served as the first female Chair of the Department of Economics at Columbia University from 2006–2009. Before Columbia, she taught at the University of California, Los Angeles and at the Massachusetts Institute of Technology. She was named one of the top 10 women in economics by the World Economic Forum in July 2015. She was recognized for her mentorship of younger economists with the Carolyn Shaw Bell award from the American Economics Association in 2015.

Education
Currie received a B.A. in economics in 1982 and a M.A. in economics in 1983 from the University of Toronto. She then pursued graduate studies at Princeton University, where she received a Ph.D. in economics in 1988.

Career
Currie co-directs the Program on Families and Children at the National Bureau of Economic Research. She is past president of the Society of Labor Economists, the Eastern Economics Association, and the American Society of Health Economics, and previously served as vice-president of the American Economic Association. She is on the Board of the American Academy of Political and Social Science, the Behavior and Inequality Research Institute, and on the Board of Academic Advisors for the Opportunity and Inclusive Growth Institute at Federal Reserve Bank of Minneapolis. Currie has served as a member of the Advisory Committee on Labor and Income Statistics for Statistics Canada and as a consultant for the National Health Interview Survey and the National Longitudinal Surveys. She also serves on the advisory boards of the National Children's Study, the Committee on National Statistics, the National Academy of Science, the Environmental Defense Fund, and Blue Health Intelligence. She currently sits on the board of governors of Hackensack Meridian School of Medicine and the New Jersey Integrated Population Health Data Project.

She served on the Board of Reviewing Editors for Science magazine from 2014–2018, and as the editor of the Journal of Economic Literature  from 2010–2013. Currie currently serves on the advisory board for the Journal of Economic Perspectives, and as Associate Editor for the Journal of Population Economics. She has previously held editorial roles for numerous economic peer-reviewed journals, including the Quarterly Journal of Economics, the Journal of Health Economics, and the Journal of Public Economics.

Research
Although Currie published several studies early in her career about collective bargaining in the public sector, she is best known for her work on the impact of poverty and government anti-poverty policies on the health and well-being of children over their life cycle. Beginning the early 1990s, she was one of the first economists to evaluate such programs from the point of view of the child. She has written about early intervention programs, expansions of Medicaid program, public housing and food and nutrition programs. In work with Duncan Thomas and Eliana Garces, she showed that children in Head Start made gains relative to their own siblings in terms of both test scores and longer-term measures of attainment. In work with Jonathan Gruber, she showed that expansions of public health insurance to low income women and children improved access to care and reduced infant mortality. Research on the effects of the safety net on American children is reviewed in her book, "The Invisible Safety Net." She also more recently has advocated for cash transfers, in conjunction with other safety nets, given their helpfulness in raising families out of poverty.

Currie has also investigated broader socioeconomic determinants of fetal and child health, including health care, child maltreatment, nutrition, environmental threats, maternal education, and smoking behaviors. Her work showing that the adoption of EZ-Pass improved infant health in Pennsylvania and New Jersey received wide attention. Some of her work showing disparities in fetal exposure to pollution and their consequences is summarized in her 2011 Ely lecture to the American Economics Association. With Anna Aizer and Hannes Schwandt, she has shown that inequality in mortality is falling among U.S. children, at the same time that inequality in mortality among adults has been increasing, and attributed this improvement to the protective effect of safety net programs. Her work on health care has focused on differences in physician behavior as one of the key determinants in variation in the care both children and adults receive.

Overall, her work shows that early childhood, including the fetal period, is of great importance for the development of children's productive capabilities (their 'human capital') and that programs targeting early childhood can be particularly effective in remediating childhood disadvantage.

She is also a strong advocate for mental health, especially because it is strongly overlooked when compared to physical health. When looking at children who have mental health disabilities, when compared to some common physical disabilities, have a greater negative impact on the person in the future. Due to the fact that there are very rarely mental health disabilities that are easy to treat when compared to physical disabilities, her work looks into the effectiveness and cost-effectiveness of treating mental health disabilities in children.

Personal
She is married to W. Bentley MacLeod, an economist at Columbia University, and together they have two children.

Awards and honors

 Fellow of the Society of Labor Economics, elected May 2006
 Fellow of the Econometric Society, elected 2013
Member of the National Academy of Medicine, elected 2013
 Member of the American Academy of Arts and Sciences, elected 2014
Eleanor Roosevelt Fellow, American Academy of Political and Social Science, 2014
Honorary Doctorate, University of Lyon, 2016
Honorary Doctorate, University of Zurich, 2017
 NOMIS Distinguished Scientist Award, 2019 
 Member of the National Academy of Sciences, elected 2019

Select publications 

 "Understanding Doctor Decision Making: The Case of Depression Treatment," Econometrica, v. 88 #3, May 2020, 847-878, with Bentley MacLeod."
 "Can Mentoring Help Female Assistant Professors in Economics? An Evaluation by Randomized Trial,” American Economic Association’s Papers and Proceedings, v. 100 #2, May 2020, 348-52,with Donna K. Ginther, Francine D. Blau, and Rachel T.A. Croson."
 "The Local Economic and Welfare Consequences of Hydraulic Fracturing,” American Economic Journal: Applied Economics, v11 #4, October 2019, 105-155, with Alexander Bartik, Michael Greenstone, Christopher Knittel."
 "What Do Economists Have to Say About the Clean Air Act 50 Years After the Establishment of the EPA?” Journal of Economic Perspectives, 33 #4, Fall 2019, 3-26 with Reed Walker."
 "Childhood Circumstances and Adult Outcomes: Act II,” the Journal of Economic Literature, Dec. 2018, 56 #4, Dec. 2018, 1360-1446, with Douglas Almond and Valentina Duque."
 "Do Low Levels of Blood Lead Reduce Children’s Future Test Scores,” American Economic Journal: Applied Economics, 10 #1, January 2018, 307-41, with Anna Aizer, Peter Simon, Patrick Vivier." 
 "The 9/11 Dust Cloud and Pregnancy Outcomes: A Reconsideration,” Journal of Human Resources, 51 #4, Fall 2016, 805-831, with Hannes Schwandt (lead article)." 
 "Inequality in mortality decreased among the young while increasing for older adults, 1990–2010," Science, 352 #6286, April 2016, 708–712, with Hannes Schwandt."
"Environmental Health Risks and Housing Values: Evidence from 1600 Toxic Plant Openings and Closings," American Economic Review, 105 #2, Feb. 2015, 678–709, with Lucas Davis, Michael Greenstone and Reed Walker.
"The Intergenerational Transmission of Inequality: Maternal Disadvantage and Health at Birth," Science, 344 #6186, May 2014, 856–861, with Anna Aizer.
"Children with Disabilities" Issue of The Future of Children, 22(1), Princeton-Brookings, Washington D.C. Spring 2012, edited with Robert Kahn.
"Inequality at Birth: Some Causes and Consequences," American Economic Review, 101 #3, May 2011, 1-22 (Ely lecture).
"Traffic Congestion and Infant Health: Evidence from E-ZPass," American Economic Journal: Applied Economics, January 2011, #3: 65–90, with Reed Walker. 
"First Do No Harm? Tort Reform and Birth Outcomes," Quarterly Journal of Economics, CXXIII #2, May 2008, 795–830, with Bentley MacLeod.
"Air Pollution and Infant Health: What Can We Learn From California's Recent Experience?" Quarterly Journal of Economics, vCXX #3, August 2005, 1003–1030, with Matthew Neidell.
"Socioeconomic Status and Health: Why is the Relationship Stronger for Older Children?," American Economic Review, v93 #5, December 2003, 1813–1823, with Mark Stabile.
"Mother's Education and the Intergenerational Transmission of Human Capital: Evidence from College Openings," Quarterly Journal of Economics, VCXVIII #4, Nov. 2003, with Enrico Moretti, 1495–1532.
"Heat or Eat? Income Shocks and the Allocation of Nutrition in American Families," American Journal of Public Health 93(7), July 2003,1149-1154, with Jayanta Bhattacharya, Thomas DeLeire, and Steven Haider.
 The Invisible Safety Net: Protecting the Nation's Poor Children and Families, Princeton University Press, Spring 2006.
"Longer Term Effects of Head Start," The American Economic Review,  v92 #4, Sept. 2002, 999–1012, with Eliana Garces and Duncan Thomas.
"Saving Babies: The Efficacy and Cost of Recent Expansions of Medicaid Eligibility for Pregnant Women," The Journal of Political Economy, December, 1996, 104 #6, 1263–1296, with Jonathan Gruber.
"Health Insurance Eligibility, Utilization of Medical Care, and Child Health," The Quarterly Journal of Economics, May 1996, 111 #2, 431–466, with Jonathan Gruber.
"Does Head Start Make A Difference?" The American Economic Review, June 1995, 85 #3, 341–364, with Duncan Thomas.
 Welfare and the Well-Being of Children, Harwood Academic Publishers, Chur Switzerland, 1995.
"Collective Bargaining in the Public Sector:  The Effect of Legal Structure on Dispute Costs and Wages," The American Economic Review, September 1991, 81 #4, 693–718, with Sheena McConnell.
"An Experimental Comparison of Dispute Rates in Alternative Arbitration Systems," Econometrica, Nov. 1992, 60 #6, 1407–1433, with Orley Ashenfelter, Janet Currie, Henry Farber and Matthew Spiegel.

References

External links 
 Janet Currie's page at Princeton University

Labor economists
20th-century Canadian economists
21st-century Canadian economists
Living people
Princeton University faculty
Princeton University alumni
University of Toronto alumni
Canadian women economists
Year of birth missing (living people)
Fellows of the Econometric Society
Education economists
Fellows of the American Academy of Arts and Sciences
American women economists
Members of the United States National Academy of Sciences
Fellows of the American Academy of Political and Social Science
21st-century American women
Members of the National Academy of Medicine